Parapercis lata, the y-barred sandperch, is a fish species in the sandperch family, Pinguipedidae. It is found in the Eastern Central Pacific, Kiribati among other locations.

References

Pinguipedidae
Taxa named by John Ernest Randall
Taxa named by John E. McCosker
Fish described in 2002